Spyros Christopoulos (born 7 October 1975) is a retired Greek footballer who played as a goalkeeper mostly for AEL and Thrasyvoulos in the Greek Super League. He now works as a goalkeepers coach in teams of lower leagues.

References

External links
Profile at Thrasivoulos FC
Goalkeepers Coach in Iraklis Psachna

1975 births
Living people
Greek footballers
Olympiacos Volos F.C. players
Athlitiki Enosi Larissa F.C. players
Thrasyvoulos F.C. players
Association football goalkeepers